The Anglican Province of Aba is one of the 14 ecclesiastical provinces of the Church of Nigeria. It comprises 9 dioceses:

Aba (Christian Ugwuzor)
Aba Ngwa North (Nathan Kanu)
Arochukwu/Ohafia (Bishop: Johnson Onuoha)
Ikwanuo (Bishop: Chigozirim Onyegbule)
Isiala-Ngwa (Bishop: Temple Nwaogu)
Isial-Ngwa South (Bishop: Isaac Nwaobia)
Isikwuato (Bishop: Manasses Chijiokem Okere)
Ukwa (Bishop: Samuel Kelechi Eze)
Umuahia (Bishop: Ikechi Nwosu)

References

External links
Anglican Province of Aba at the Anglican Communion Official Website

Church of Nigeria ecclesiastical provinces